Said Yusupovich Seyidov (born 22 January 1962) is a Turkmen football coach and a former Soviet footballer. Current head coach of FC Ahal.

Playing career 
Seýidow was born in Ashgabat. He started his career in the FC Kolkhozchi Ashgabat. Later he played for the club from the Uzbek SSR for FC Zvezda Jizzakh, as well as for the clubs from the Turkmen SSR: FC Kopetdag, FC Ahal, FC Nebitchi, FC Nisa and FC Turan. For most of his soccer career he played as a midfielder.

Managing career 
In 1996-1998 he was the head coach of FC Buzmeyin.

In 1999-2000 he worked as a senior coach at FC Galkan Ashgabat.

In 2000–2004, he was a senior coach at FC Nisa Ashgabat.

In 2002 he worked with Youth national football team of Turkmenistan as a senior coach.

In 2003-2004  he was a senior coach at National football team of Turkmenistan. For reaching the finals of the Asian Championship in China, he was awarded the title of Honored Football Coach of Turkmenistan.

2005-2006 he worked as coach in FC Navbahor Namangan (Uzbekistan).

2006 - FC Shurtan (Guzar, Uzbekistan) - coach.

2007—2010 Academy of FC "Mashal" (Mubarek, Uzbekistan) - head coach.

2010 - FC "Nasaf" (Karshi, Uzbekistan) - coach of the reserve team.

2011-2012 FC Shurtan (Guzar, Uzbekistan) - senior coach.

2014 FC "Bukhara" (Uzbekistan) - acting head coach.

For four years he worked as the head coach of FK Köpetdag Aşgabat in the period 2015–2019. In the first year of work, the team won the First league of Turkmenistan and got a place to play in the Ýokary Liga. Under his leadership, FС Kopetdag won the 2018 Turkmenistan Cup.

On 6 August 2019, Seýidow was appointed manager of FC Ashgabat. In July 2020, he left the club by mutual consent.

On 19 August 2020, he signed a contract with Ýokary Liga club FC Ahal.

On 31 March 2022, Seýidow became the manager of Turkmenistan national team.

Honours 
FK Köpetdag Aşgabat
Turkmenistan First League (1): 2015
Turkmenistan Cup (1): 2018

References

External links
 

Soviet footballers
Turkmenistan footballers
Living people
Turkmenistan football managers
Sportspeople from Ashgabat
Turkmenistan national football team managers
Association football midfielders
FC Sogdiana Jizzakh players
FC Nisa Aşgabat players
FK Köpetdag Aşgabat players
FC Ahal players
Uzbekistan Super League players
FC Nisa Aşgabat managers
FK Köpetdag Aşgabat managers
PFK Nurafshon managers
Turkmenistan expatriate sportspeople in Uzbekistan
1962 births